Camille Landais (born 1 February 1981) is a French economist who currently works as Professor of economics at the London School of Economics. His research focuses on public finance and labour economics. In 2016, Landais was awarded the Prize of Best Young Economist of France for his research on the relationship between changes in inequality and fiscal and social policy.

Biography

From 2000 to 2005, Camille Landais studied at the École normale supérieure d'Ulm (ENS Ulm), followed by a PhD at the Paris School of Economics under Thomas Piketty, Anthony Atkinson and Bernard Salanié (2005–09). After his graduation and a brief stay at the University of California-Berkeley, Landais worked as a postdoctoral researcher at the Stanford Institute for Economic Policy Research (SIEPR) (2010–12). Since 2012 he has been working at the London School of Economics, first as assistant professor (2012–15), then as associate professor (2016) and since 2017 as Professor of Economics. In addition to his academic position, he maintains affiliations with the Institut des politiques publiques, Institute for Fiscal Studies, STICERD, IZA Institute of Labor Economics, Centre for Economic Policy Research (CEPR), where he directs the public economics programme, and the European Economic Association, on whose council he sits. Finally, Landais is or has also performed editorial duties for the Journal of Public Economics, Review of Economic Studies, Fiscal Studies and Economic Policy. He is a fellow of the European Economic Association.

Research

Camille Landais' research interests include taxation, social insurance and pro-social behaviours. The key findings of his research include the following:
 Denmark's preferential foreigner tax scheme doubled the ratio between of highly paid foreigners in Denmark relative to slightly less paid and thus ineligible foreigners, implying a large tax elasticity of migration among high income earners, but also reduced the pre-tax earnings of eligible foreigners relative to those of non-eligible ones by 5–10% (with Henrik Jacobsen Kleven, Emmanuel Saez and Esben Anton Schultz).
 Football players in Europe, especially when outside their home country, are very sensitive to taxation, with low taxes attracting high-ability players who displace low-ability ones and low taxes on foreigners displacing domestic players.

Selected publications

 Algan, Y., Landais, C., Senik, C. (2010). Cultural assimilation in France. In: Algan, Y., Senik, C. (eds.). Cultural integration in Europe. Oxford: CEPR/Oxford University Press.
 Landais, C., Piketty, T., Saez, E. (2011). Pour une révolution fiscale: un impôt sur le revenu pour le 21ème siècle. Paris: Éditions Seuil.

References

External links

 Profile of Camille Landais on the website of LSE

1981 births
French economists
Academics of the London School of Economics
Paris School of Economics alumni
École Normale Supérieure alumni
Labor economists
Living people
Fellows of the European Economic Association